Calipatria (portmanteau of California and Patria, Spanish for "homeland") is a city in Imperial County, California. It is part of the El Centro Metropolitan Area. The population was 6,515 at the 2020 census, down from 7,710 at the 2010 census, up from 7,289 at the 2000 census, including 4000 inmates at Calipatria State Prison. The community is located along State Route 111.

Geography 

According to the Guinness Book of World Records, the Jeddah Flagpole holds the title of world's tallest, but it is entirely above sea level.

Climate
This area has a large amount of sunshine year round due to its stable descending air and high pressure.  According to the Köppen Climate Classification system, Calipatria has a hot desert climate, abbreviated "Bwh" on climate maps.

History 

The Imperial Valley Farm Lands Association founded the town as Date City in 1914. The first post office at Calipatria opened in 1914. Calipatria incorporated in 1919.

Demographics

2010
At the 2010 census Calipatria had a population of 7,800. The racial makeup of Calipatria was 3,212 (41.7%) White, 1,612 (20.9%) African American, 80 (1.0%) Native American, Hispanic or Latino of any race were 4,940 persons (64.1%), 95 (1.2%) Asian, 25 (0.3%) Pacific Islander, 2,455 (31.9%) from other races, and 227 (2.9%) from two or more races.
The census reported that 3,541 people (46.0% of the population) lived in households, no one lived in non-institutionalized group quarters and 4,164 (54.0%) were institutionalized.

There were 1,008 households, 541 (53.7%) had children under the age of 18 living in them, 515 (51.0%) were opposite-sex married couples living together, 213 (21.1%) had a female householder with no husband present, 92 (9.1%) had a male householder with no wife present.  There were 53 (5.3%) unmarried opposite-sex partnerships, and 15 (1.5%) same-sex married couples or partnerships. 162 households (16.1%) were one person and 70 (6.9%) had someone living alone who was 65 or older. The average household size was 3.51.  There were 819 families (81.3% of households); the average family size was 3.92.

The age distribution was 1,246 people (16.2%) under the age of 18, 932 people (12.1%) aged 18 to 24, 3,738 people (48.5%) aged 25 to 44, 1,431 people (18.6%) aged 45 to 64, and 358 people (4.6%) who were 65 or older.  The median age was 32.9 years. For every 100 females, there were 330.9 males.  For every 100 females age 18 and over, there were 427.3 males.

There were 1,121 housing units at an average density of ,of which 1,008 were occupied, 536 (53.2%) by the owners and 472 (46.8%) by renters.  The homeowner vacancy rate was 5.9%; the rental vacancy rate was 10.6%.  1,867 people (24.2% of the population) lived in owner-occupied housing units and 1,674 people (21.7%) lived in rental housing units.

2000
At the 2000 census there were 7,289 people in 899 households, including 756 families, in the city. The racial makeup of the city was 32.4% White, 21.3% Black or African American, 0.7% Native American, 0.6% Asian, <0.1% Pacific Islander, 42.7% from other races, and 2.3% from two or more races. 57.4% of the population were Hispanic or Latino of any race.
Of the 899 households 50.4% had children under the age of 18 living with them, 61.2% were married couples living together, 17.6% had a female householder with no husband present, and 15.8% were non-families. 14.1% of households were one person and 5.6% were one person aged 65 or older. The average household size was 3.6 and the average family size was 3.9.

The age distribution was 16.3% under the age of 18, 12.3% from 18 to 24, 52.6% from 25 to 44, 15.0% from 45 to 64, and 3.8% 65 or older. The median age was 33 years. For every 100 females, there were 363.4 males. For every 100 females age 18 and over, there were 497.5 males.

The median income for a household in the city was $60,962, and the median family income  was $61,302. Males had a median income of $61,350 versus $50,063 for females. The per capita income for the city was $43,970. About 2.4% of families and 2.4% of the population were below the poverty line, including 28.9% of those under age 18 and 17.8% of those age 65 or over.

Calipatria is one of the state's poorest cities in income per capita due to agricultural paychecks and a declined economy in the 1990s. Hispanics, mostly of Mexican descent, comprise three-fourths of residents (excluding the multiracial body of state prison convicts). The city was first called Sante Patria (as in "Saint of the Motherland") and was founded by Irish American and Irish Mexican soldiers, who deserted both in the Mexican–American War (1850s) and from the Union and/or Confederate armies after the American Civil War (1860s). Calipatria also has a large Arab population with origins from Jordan, Lebanon, and Syria, descendants of agriculture laborers in the 1920s.

Politics 

Infrastructure

Transportation 
Freight rail service is provided by Union Pacific Railroad's Calexico Subdivision.

Utilities
Calipatria is served by  Golden State Water Company, Imperial Irrigation District, Southern California Gas, and Pacific Bell.

Landmarks 
Salvation Mountain is a notable tourist attraction in the north of Calipatria, near Slab City. Salvation Mountain is a small hill which is entirely covered in thousands of gallons of acrylic paint, straw, concrete, adobe. It was created by Leonard Knight to convey the message that "God Loves Everyone". Salvation Mountain was featured in the book Into the Wild and also in the 2007 movie of the same name. The video for Fourth of July, by Shooter Jennings, is partially set at Salvation Mountain.

Sister cities
 Brawley, California

See also

 Cliff Hatfield Memorial Airport
 San Diego–Imperial, California
 El Centro Metropolitan Area

References

External links
 

Cities in Imperial County, California

Communities in the Lower Colorado River Valley
Imperial Valley
Incorporated cities and towns in California
Populated places in the Colorado Desert
Populated places established in 1919
1919 establishments in California